A mobile virtual network operator (MVNO) is a wireless communications services provider that does not own the wireless network infrastructure over which it provides services to its customers. An MVNO enters into a business agreement with a mobile network operator to obtain bulk access to network services at wholesale rates, then sets retail prices independently. An MVNO may use its own customer service, billing support systems, marketing, and sales personnel, or it could employ the services of a mobile virtual network enabler (MVNE).

History
MVNO agreements with network operators date back to the 1990s, when the European telecom market saw market liberalization, new regulatory frameworks, better 2G network technology, and a subsequent jump in wireless subscriber numbers. Though the new 2G networks more efficiently managed the limited frequency bands allocated to wireless service, new mobile entrants were still limited by their ability to access frequency bands in a restricted spectrum.

With European markets newly open to competition and new technology enabling better service and cheaper handsets, there was a massive surge in demand for cellular phones. In the midst of this swell, Sense Communications fought for access to mobile network operator (MNO) spectrum in Scandinavia in 1997. Sense was able to establish an MVNO agreement with Sonera in Finland, but it failed to persuade MNOs in Sweden, Denmark, and Norway. Sense then appealed to EU regulators, citing provisions that required certain MNOs to allow new entrants interconnection. While Sense's claim was denied, in November 1999, the company signed a service provider agreement with Telia/Telenor Mobile for GSM network capacity access, allowing Sense to offer services to its own customers in Sweden and Norway.

Despite Sense's initial failure, the regulator in Denmark saw the promise in the MVNO model as a cost-effective route for telecom companies to enter the market and in May 2000, legislation passed that required network operators with significant market power to open up access to their infrastructure. By August of that same year, the MNO SONOFON had solidified the first viable MVNO agreement with Tele2. This agreement provided Tele2 with access to SONOFON's network for both mobile and roaming services, the latter of which had been requested by (and denied to) Sense Communications. With the new regulations in place, MVNOs in Scandinavia eventually grew to a market share of above 10%.

By 2008, US wireless subscribers had a choice between around 40 MVNOs. According to the FCC, approximately 7% of all U.S. mobile subscribers were served by resellers, including MVNOs, and analysts found that the 15.1 million wireless subscribers served by resellers by the end of 2006 had increased by 1.6 million over the previous year.

Types
MVNOs are distinguished by their commitment to owning and managing the operational components of the MVNO business model, consisting of: 
 Access to basic network infrastructure, like base stations, transceivers, home location registers, and switching centres. 
 Service packaging, pricing, and billing systems, including value-added services like voicemail and missed call notifications.
 Consumer-facing aspects like sales, marketing, and customer relationship management activities like customer care and dispute resolution.

Because MVNOs are effectively defined by their lack of spectrum licenses, an MVNO necessarily will need to have agreements in place to access the network of at least one MNO. The type of MVNO is determined by how "thick" or "thin" a technological layer an MVNO adds over its access to its host MNO's network.

Branded reseller 
Sometimes referred to as a "Skinny MVNO", as the reseller almost totally relies on the MNO's facilities. They do not own any network elements, but may own and operate their own customer care, marketing, and sales operations.

Service Provider 
Sometimes referred to as a "Light MVNO". The service provider operates its own customer support, marketing, sales and distribution operations, and has the ability to set its tariffs independently from the retail prices set by the MNO.

Enhanced Service Provider 
Sometimes referred to as a "Thick MVNO". The MVNO manages a more complete technical implementation with its own infrastructure which allows the MVNO more control over its offerings. These MVNOs have a heavier focus on branding, customer-ownership, and differentiation through added services like data and SIM applications.

Full mobile virtual network operator 
These MVNOs have a network implementation operating essentially the same technology as a mobile network operator. Full MVNOs only lack their own radio networks.

Around the world
As of June 2014, 943 MVNOs and 255 MNO sub-brands were active worldwide. This represents a total of almost 1,200 mobile service providers worldwide hosted by MNOs, up from 1,036 in 2012,

According to GSMA Intelligence, between June 2010 and June 2015, the number of MVNOs worldwide increased by 70 percent, reaching 1,017 in June 2015.

As of December 2018, there were 1,300 active MVNOs operating in 80 countries, representing more than 220 million mobile connections--approximately 2.46% of the total 8.9 billion mobile connections in the world. The eight countries with the largest number of active MVNOs in 2018 were: the US with 139 MVNOs (4.7% market share), Germany with 135 (19.5% market share), Japan 83 (10.6%), UK 77 (15.9%), Australia 66 (13.1%), Spain 63 (11.5%), France 53 (11.2%) and Denmark 49 (34.6%).

In addition to traditional cellular voice and messaging services, in 2014, 120 MVNOs also were offering mobile broadband services. In Africa, Uganda has registered three MVNOs so far, some having their own network infrastructure within major cities, but acting as an MVNO out of these cities.

In 2015, one of the "big five" banks in South Africa, FNB, created an MVNO named FNB Connect providing voice, SMS and data services. As of 31 December 2019, FNB Connect had around 670,000 subscribers. The service makes use of Cell C network infrastructure. The move came not necessarily to compete in the telecommunications market, but to offer a greater value to customers of the banking division. There have been several banks in South Africa making this move, like Standard Bank's SB Mobile established in 2019.

MVNOs target both the consumer and enterprise markets. The majority of MVNOs are consumer-focused and most have a focus on price as their selling point; on average, customers of major carriers spend about 3.4 times as much on their service as MVNO customers.

At the end of year 2022, there were 1,986 active MVNOs globally, more than double the amount of traditional telecom network operators. Europe lead in terms of most active MVNOs in operation with 1,012, representing half of the total global MVNO market. It is followed by Americas with 379 MVNOs, Asia with 322, International with 131, Oceania with 84, Africa with 54 and Middle East with 5.

Multiple countries MVNOs 
Some MVNOs have a presence in multiple countries, either as subsidiaries, joint ventures, or through brand licensing agreements with local partners. i.e. Lycamobile 23 countries, Virgin Mobile 14 countries, Lebara 10 countries, CMLink five countries, Tesco Mobile four countries, Line Mobile three countries, Aldi Talk six countries, Kogan.com Mobile two countries, L-Mobi Mobile two countries.

Japan
Japan has about 80 MVNO brands, and the market share of MVNOs is 12.2% in 2019. The total number of contractors is 22.3 million.

United States

There are 139 MVNO brands in the US, which are estimated to sell service to about 7 out of every 100 US wireless subscribers, representing 23 million customers in all. US MVNOs resell service offered by the three national network carriers: AT&T, T-Mobile, and Verizon. The number of MVNO customers doubled between 2009 and 2012 because the FCC set rules easing the ability for customers to switch networks.

The three US national carriers have partial or full ownership of several large MVNO brands, such as Cricket Wireless (AT&T), Visible (Verizon), and Metro by T-Mobile (T-Mobile)

United Kingdom
The UK had 77 active MVNOs as of December 2018. The MVNOs combined market share was 15.9% of the total UK mobile market, representing 15.3 million connections; that is, 23 out of every 100 subscribers having their mobile phone service with an MVNO.

Ireland 

Ireland has 7 active MVNO brands as of February 2021, and the market share of MVNOs in 2022 is 13.4%

Regulation
In 2003, the European Commission issued a recommendation to national telecom regulators to examine the competitiveness of the market for wholesale access and call origination on public mobile telephone networks.  The study resulted in new regulations from regulators in several countries, including Ireland and France forcing operators to open up their networks to MVNOs.

Jordan's top watchdog issued its first MVNO regulations in 2008, facilitating the creation of the first MVNO in the Arab world in 2010.

The Saudi government is making preparations to permit MVNO services in the country.

In Brazil, MVNOs are regulated by Anatel, the Brazilian Agency of Telecommunications, in November 2010. As of September 2014 the combined market share of all Brazilian MVNOs was just 0.04%.

In Thailand, five MVNOs were given a Type II license to operate on the 2100 MHz 3G network of state telecom service TOT Public Company Limited (TOT) in 2009. As of January 2017, two of the original five MVNOs are still in service. As of December 2018, the National Broadcasting and Telecommunications Commission (NBTC) had issued 58 MVNO licenses in Thailand, a total of nine have launched, four remain active.

In India, the Telecom Department under the Ministry of Communications and Information Technology, accepted a recommendation from the national telecom regulator, Telecom Regulatory Authority of India, to permit VNOs in the country, and announced the grant of a unified license for Virtual Network Operators on 31 May 2016. VNOs have formed an association to represent current regulatory issues impacting their MVNO business viability.

See also

 Competitive local exchange carrier (CLEC)
 List of Europe MNOs
 List of Turkey MVNO
 List of United Kingdom MVNOs
 List of United States MVNOs
 Virtual Network Operator (VNO)

References

Mobile technology